Kleobis (Cleobis) and Biton (Ancient Greek: Κλέοβις, gen.: Κλεόβιδος; Βίτων, gen.: Βίτωνος) are two Archaic Greek Kouros brothers from Argos, whose stories date back to about 580 BC. Two statues, discovered in Delphi, represent them.

The story can first be seen in Herodotus’ Histories (1.31), where Solon tells King of Lydia, Croesus about the happiest person in the world.

Legend

Herodotus' story 
The legend begins with the story of Solon, upon his meeting with Croesus. Solon was an Athenian statesman, lawmaker, and poet and Croesus was the King of Lydia who reigned for 14 years. Croesus, concerned about his legacy over the kingdom, takes the time to ask Solon who he found to be the happiest person in the world. Upon his reply, Solon names three separate people. The first being Tellus, the second and third being the brothers known as Kleobis and Biton. When hearing about this news, Croesus was confused as to why he was not considered to be one of the happiest of men. In response, Solon shares first the tale of Tellus and then the tale of Kleobis and Biton.

In the story, Solon tells of how these Argive brothers took their mother named Cydippe, a priestess at the temple of Hera, to a festival for the goddess to be held in town. When their mother's oxen could not be found, the brothers yoked themselves to their mother's cart and drove her the six miles to the temple. Having arrived at the festival, the mother prayed for Hera to bestow a gift upon her sons for their strength and devotion, which Hera listened and rewarded the sons. When the prayers and the sacrifice were over, Kleobis and Biton fell asleep in the temple and never woke up, which was the gift Hera bestowed on the boys: allowing for them to die. To honor the two brothers, the people of Argos dedicated statues of them to the temple of Apollo at Delphi, allowing for these statues to be seen as funeral memorials.

Upon hearing this story, Solon's advice to Croesus were “the uncertainties of life mean that no one can be completely happy.” Either one can experience the joys of having continuous prosperity, much like Tellus, or one can experience a life of death, which can be granted as a reward like it was to Kleobis and Biton. The lesson of the legend is to showcase that those who live a moderately happy life are shown to have a glamorous death. It also shows that "it was better for a man to die than to live."

Interpretation 
In the context of Herodotus' narrative, Solon is communicating to Croesus that

 human happiness is not dependent on wealth (which is Croesus' view at that point), and
 happiness cannot be evaluated in the case of any given person until that person has died (when the story of their life is complete).

"Happiness" translates the ancient Greek word eudaimonia, which does not have to do with emotion but rather with the good fortune that a person has in life overall.

Statues

History 
Herodotus records that "the Argives had statues of them made and set them up at Delphi, because they had been such excellent men". These two statues are known to be similar to other funerary monuments of the Archaic time, which were set up by the parents of the fallen warriors. The Delphi Archaeological Museum displays two identical Archaic kouroi under the names of Cleobis and Biton, although other archaeologists who have studied the statues, see in them the twin sons of Zeus, the Dioscouri, worship of whom was quite widespread in the Peloponnese.

Inscriptions on the base of the statues identify them as ϜΑΝΑΚΩΝ (wanakōn), i.e. the "princes", an attribute usually given to Castor and Pollux in Argos, a fact which supported the identification with the Dioscuri. The inscription also identifies Polymedes of Argos as the sculptor: something which was very unusual at such an early date. The statues are in what is regarded as a typical Peloponnesian style: massive and muscular. Their left foot is stepping forward, whereas their hands are bent at the elbows, touching the thighs, hands closed in fists. The hair are curly over the forefront and hang on the shoulders. Their eyes are large and almond-shaped, crowned by high eyebrows. Their faces bear the typical archaic smile. They wore high-soled sandals. Each figure stood on a different stepping stone but they were both standing on the same pedestal. The date suggested for their creation is ca. 580 BC. They are considered a typical specimen of the Archaic sculpture of the Peloponnese.

Connection to kouros figures 
These statues share a connection with the fundamentals of what a kouros statue is, meaning that they are free-standing figures that depict the male youth that are depicted in symmetry and pattern.

The earliest depiction of kouros statues can be found in Egyptian culture, where the style of the sculpture shows stability, by being depicted by a single viewpoint in the front. Here, the two sculptures can be seen with a foot movement, to imply movement, with idealized features, from the oval eyes to the fist clenched on each side of their torsos. However, these two statues do seem to suggest that the Greeks are moving away from the strict lines of the Egyptians and are beginning to move towards the ideal of depicting more realistic figures.

In Greece, kouros "signifies youth and manhood, sometimes warrior status... it is related to the word koros, that signifies seedling or shoot of a plant."

Description 

Standing side by side, these marble statues stand on separate blocks that are supported by the same base that bears some part of an inscription on the bottom. The two statues are each stepping forward with one leg, arms locked to their sides. They are stocky in build, with broad shoulders and faces, and they are naked except for boots — which could be a sign of the god Apollo or could indicate that they were travelers. Their hair is a single row of large disk-like curls that line the forehead, with the rest of the hair combed then subdivided into bead-like elements that spring out from the base of the neck, each tendril being finished off with a tie.

Heroic nudity 
In the case of Kleobis and Biton, the depiction of heroic nudity can be seen in the "essentially unrealistic, in so far as warriors are without clothes or body armor; yet there is still vivid interest in the postures of life deserting the heroic body." The town of Argos was not known for depicting kouroi, but the statues of these two brothers were built by the enthusiastic Argives as a message to other city-states. Though it is still not confirmed whether these statues were modeled after the legend, the legend does seem to fit in hand with the time of Herodotus' tale.

Athletic depiction 
The greatest test of strength for the two young men came when they were challenged with having to take their mother to town as her oxen. The extent of their muscular depiction is emphasized to characterize them as to represent the brute strength of the Argive style, found in the High Archaic period.

See also
 Excavations at Delphi
 Ancient Greek sculpture

References

External links
Herodotus on Kleobis and Biton
	Permanent exhibition of the Archaeological Museum of Delphi - Kleobis and Biton.

Archaic Greek sculptures
Ancient Argives
Sibling duos